Euphorbia clivicola , is a species of plant in the family Euphorbiaceae native to southern Africa.

References 

clivicola
clivicola